James Gang may refer to:

 The James Gang, a 1970s rock band
 The James Gang (film), a 1997 film directed by Mike Barker
 The James-Younger Gang, a 19th-century criminal gang centered on Frank and Jesse James
 The James Gang, the former name of wrestling tag team of Kip James and BG James
A nickname for LeBron James's supporting cast with the Cleveland Cavaliers